The 1964 Australian One and a Half Litre Championship was a CAMS sanctioned motor racing title for drivers of Australian 1½ Litre Formula racing cars. The title was contested over a 34 lap, 76½ miles (123 km) race held at the Warwick Farm circuit in New South Wales, Australia on 6 September 1964. This was the first national title for the Australian 1½ Litre Formula which was in its first year of existence.

Results

Note: Leo Geoghegan damaged his Lotus 27 during Saturday practice after recording the second fastest time. He did not start in the race.

References

Australian One and a Half Litre Championship
One and a Half Litre Championship
Motorsport at Warwick Farm